Jordan has competed at one celebration of the Mediterranean Games.in Tunis 2001

References

Jordan at the Mediterranean Games